"Too Funky" is a song written and performed by English singer and songwriter George Michael and released by Columbia Records in the United States and Epic Records elsewhere in 1992. The song was Michael's final single for his recording contract with Sony Music before he started legal action to extricate himself from it. 

"Too Funky" had been initially earmarked for a follow-up to the album Listen Without Prejudice Vol. 1 but Michael shelved the idea, instead donating it, along with two other songs, to the project Red Hot + Dance (1992), which raised money for AIDS awareness. Michael subsequently donated the royalties to the same cause. The song never appeared on any of Michael's studio albums, although later it was included on his first solo collection, Ladies & Gentlemen: The Best of George Michael (1998), and in the 2017 reissue of Listen Without Prejudice Vol. 1, which also included the two other songs from Red Hot + Dance and its B-side "Crazyman Dance", all of which were recorded for the aborted follow-up of the 1990 album. It reached number one in Denmark and became a top-10 hit in several regions, including Europe, Australia, and North America. 

In 2020, Slant Magazine placed "Too Funky" at number 55 in their list of "The 100 Best Dance Songs of All Time".

Composition
Lyrically, the song is a basic, animalistic plea for sexual activity.

A line by Anne Bancroft's ("I am not trying to seduce you... Would you like me to seduce you? Is that what you're trying to tell me?") from The Graduate appears in the intro of the song and is repeated during the final crescendo. The song then ends with a sample from an episode of the Tony Hancock sitcom Hancock called "The Radio Ham", spoken by actress Annie Leake ("Would you stop playing with that radio of yours? I'm trying to get to sleep," a sample that also appeared in the song "Let Mom Sleep" from the video game Jet Set Radio and "Underachievers" by Junkie XL).

The song's hook also samples Jocelyn Brown's 1984 hit "Somebody Else's Guy".

Commercial performance
"Too Funky" reached number four on the UK Singles Chart in 1992 and became that year's most played record in Europe. As of October 2017, the single sold 168,000 copies in UK. In the US, the single debuted at number 41 on Billboard Hot 100, reaching its peak position of number ten in its ninth and tenth weeks. It sold more than 500,000 copies, being certified Gold by the RIAA.

In Australia, "Too Funky" became the biggest gainer song ever in the top 50 of the Australian ARIA Singles Chart when it jumped from number 50 to number eight (42 places), before reaching its peak position at number three. "Too Funky" held this record until 2009, when "3" by Britney Spears rose from number 50 to number seven (43 places). In Canada, "Too Funky" peaked at number six on the RPM Top Singles chart.

Critical reception

Scottish Aberdeen Press and Journal commented, "George obviously having a go at trying to get into the dance scene with this too-fiinky number which rings of Bobby Brown and Michael Jackson." Larry Flick from Billboard felt that the singer "works up an impressive sweat amid a swirling array of funk-driven guitars and keyboards, adding, "This bears all the marks of a well-deserved multiformat smash." A reviewer from Cashbox declared the song as a "simple, funky dance send-up". Amy Linden from Entertainment Weekly called it a "slinky, disco-fever-redux hit". Irish Evening Herald found that the "steamy" single is about a "big build-up to a seduction", "but it's got a depressing end. Some things never change, but we can definitely tell you that although George's hair is shorter these days, he's still got the same beard." Dave Sholin from the Gavin Report stated that Michael "delivers just the type of sound a lot of longtime fans were hoping for. He rides this groove with a sexy undercurrent reinforced by sampling the voice of Anne Bancroft seducing Dustin Hoffman in The Graduate. 

Dennis Hunt from Los Angeles Times viewed it as a "sizzling" new dance track, stating that "Too Funky” "ranks with his best and is an indication that he should focus on dance music." Melody Maker said it's "George doing a rumbustuous Karaoke Prince, the extravagant minimalist backing coming courtesy of many of the world's highest-paid session musicians. Which is all weirdly endearing." Pan-European magazine Music & Media described it as a "funky and catchy number, underpinned by a persistent keyboard pattern." Alan Jones from Music Week named it Pick of the Week, writing, "Released 10 years to the week after George made his recording debut with the instantly successful "Wham Rap", it's a muscular, mid-tempo urban dance contender bass-based with some nice piano fills. George groupies, dance fans and casual record buyers alike will warm to it, with obvious chartresults." David Quantick from New Musical Express called it "a plonking, KC and the Sunshine Band pastiche with a few hooks but nothing else." Victoria Segal from NME said, "A consummate narcissist - "I'd love to see you naked, baby... maybe tonight, if that's alright", he intones coolly on the staccato seduction of 'Too Funky'". Bunny Sawyer from Smash Hits gave the song four out of five, praising it as "a fab stomp-along beat...a triumphant return to form."

Music video
Fashion designer Thierry Mugler designed and created the costumes for the models in the song's accompanying music video, which shows Michael in two- to three-second appearances as a director filming a number of supermodels on the catwalk at a fictitious runway show, a concept similar to the one he used in the video for his 1990 single "Freedom '90."

The models appearing in this video were Eva Herzigova, Linda Evangelista, Nadja Auermann, Emma Sjöberg, Estelle Hallyday, Shana Zadrick, Tyra Banks and Beverly Peele. Actresses Julie Newmar and Rossy de Palma, and the performance artists Joey Arias and Lypsinka are also shown. A "making of" video was also created.

The video's concept was written by Jeff Beasley after attending a benefit fashion show held by Mugler several months before in Los Angeles. Beasley worked at Propaganda Films, the production company where David Fincher directed "Freedom! '90" — the supermodel video on which "Too Funky" is based. Originally the same models from Fincher's video were going to be used, namely Evangelista, Naomi Campbell, Christy Turlington, Cindy Crawford, and Tatjana Patitz. Mugler decided, however, that he wanted new models and only kept Evangelista for the project. The video was produced by Beasley and filmed by Mike Southon.

A rare "alternate edit" of the video includes several male models, including eventual Grey's Anatomy star Justin Chambers and Oscar-nominated actor Djimon Hounsou, who was discovered by Mugler in Paris, and sometimes can be found online.

Impact and legacy
In 2012, Porcys listed the song at number 62 in their ranking of "100 Singles 1990-1999". 

In 2017, BuzzFeed ranked "Too Funky" number 60 in their list of "The 101 Greatest Dance Songs of the '90s".

In 2020, Slant Magazine placed it at number 55 in their list of "The 100 Best Dance Songs of All Time".

Track listing

 7-inch single
 "Too Funky" – 3:45
 "Crazyman Dance" – 3:34

 12-inch single, UK (658058 6)
 "Too Funky" (extended) – 5:01
 "Crazyman Dance" – 6:00

 12-inch single, UK (658058 8)
 "Too Funky" (Extended) – 5:37
 "Too Jazzy" (Happy Mix) – 5:53
 "Too Funky" (Digital Mix) – 6:25

 12-inch single, US
 "Too Funky" (Extended) – 5:37
 "Too Funky" (Digital Mix) – 6:25
 "Too Jazzy" (Happy Mix) – 5:53
 "Crazyman Dance" – 5:52

 CD single, Australia
 "Too Funky" – 3:49
 "Crazyman Dance" – 5:55
 "Too Funky" (Extended) – 5:39

 CD single, Europe
 "Too Funky" (Extended) – 5:37
 "Too Jazzy" (Happy Mix) – 5:53
 "Too Funky" (Digital Mix) – 6:25

 CD single, UK
 "Too Funky" (Extended) – 5:37
 "Crazyman Dance" – 5:52
 "Too Funky" – 3:45

 CD single, US
 "Too Funky" (Extended) – 5:37
 "Too Funky" (Digital Mix) – 6:25
 "Too Jazzy" (Happy Mix) – 5:53
 "Too Funky" (Single version) – 3:45
 "Crazyman Dance" – 5:52

Charts and certifications

Weekly charts

Year-end charts

Certifications and sales

References

1992 singles
1992 songs
Columbia Records singles
Dance-pop songs
Epic Records singles
George Michael songs
Number-one singles in Denmark
Songs written by George Michael
Song recordings produced by George Michael